Freddy Antonio Álvarez Rodríguez (born 26 April 1995) is a Costa Rican footballer who plays as a midfielder for Shkupi.

Career

Álvarez started his career with Costa Rican top flight side Saprissa. In 2014, he signed for Uruguay de Coronado in Costa Rica. Before the 2017 season, Álvarez signed for Peruvian club Municipal. Before the second half of 2017–18, he signed for Alajuelense in Costa Rica, where he made 31 league appearances and scored 2 goals. On 18 March 2018, Álvarez debuted for Alajuelense during a 1–0 win over Cartaginés. On 4 March 2019, he scored his first goal for Alajuelense during a 2–2 draw with La U. 

In 2020, Álvarez signed for Macedonian team Shkupi, helping them win the league, their only major trophy.

References

External links

 

1995 births
A.D.R. Jicaral players
Association football midfielders
Costa Rican expatriate footballers
Costa Rican footballers
C.S. Herediano footballers
C.S. Uruguay de Coronado players
Deportivo Municipal footballers
Deportivo Saprissa players
Expatriate footballers in North Macedonia
Expatriate footballers in Peru
KF Shkupi players
L.D. Alajuelense footballers
Liga FPD players
Living people 
 Macedonian First Football League players
Peruvian Primera División players